Ida Elise Enget (born 14 June 1989) is a Norwegian footballer who plays as a forward. She has been a member of the Norway women's national team.

International goals

References

External links

1989 births
Living people
Norwegian women's footballers
Women's association football forwards
Toppserien players
LSK Kvinner FK players
Stabæk Fotball Kvinner players
Norway women's international footballers
Norway women's youth international footballers